The 1974 East Carolina Pirates football team was an American football team that represented East Carolina University as a member of the Southern Conference during the 1974 NCAA Division I football season. In their first season under head coach Pat Dye, the team compiled a 7–4 record.

Schedule

References

East Carolina
East Carolina Pirates football seasons
East Carolina Pirates football